Ham and Eggs at the Front is a 1927 American silent comedy film directed by Roy Del Ruth and starring Tom Wilson, Heinie Conklin and Myrna Loy - all in blackface. The film was released with a Vitaphone synchronized soundtrack with a music score and sound effects. Long thought to be a lost film, a print was screened at the Pordenone Silent Film Festival in 2021 courtesy of the Cineteca Italiana.

Cast
 Tom Wilson as Ham  
 Heinie Conklin as Eggs  
 Myrna Loy as Fifi 
 William Irving as von Friml  
 Noah Young as Sergeant  
 Louise Fazenda as Cally Brown  
 Tom Kennedy as Lazarus

References

External links
 

1927 films
1927 comedy films
1920s English-language films
American silent feature films
Silent American comedy films
Films directed by Roy Del Ruth
Warner Bros. films
American World War I films
American black-and-white films
1920s American films